Dynamin-3 is a protein that in humans is encoded by the DNM3 gene. The protein encoded by this gene is a member of the dynamin family which possess mechanochemical properties involved in actin-membrane processes, predominantly in membrane budding. DNM3 is upregulated in Sézary's syndrome.

References

Further reading

External links